Johanna de Boer (6 January 1901 – 7 August 1984) was a Dutch fencer. She competed in the women's individual foil at three Olympic Games.

References

External links
 

1901 births
1984 deaths
Dutch female foil fencers
Olympic fencers of the Netherlands
Fencers at the 1924 Summer Olympics
Fencers at the 1928 Summer Olympics
Fencers at the 1932 Summer Olympics
Fencers from Amsterdam
20th-century Dutch women
20th-century Dutch people